Spialia ploetzi, the forest grizzled skipper, is a butterfly in the family Hesperiidae. It is found in Guinea-Bissau, Guinea, Sierra Leone, Liberia, Ivory Coast, Ghana, Togo, Benin, Nigeria, Cameroon, Gabon, the Republic of the Congo, Angola, the Democratic Republic of the Congo, Uganda, Kenya and Tanzania. The habitat consists of forests.

The larvae feed on Triumfetta species.

Subspecies
Spialia ploetzi ploetzi (Cameroon, Gabon, Congo, Angola, Democratic Republic of Congo, Uganda, western Kenya, north-western Tanzania)
Spialia ploetzi occidentalis de Jong, 1977 (Guinea-Bissau, Guinea, Sierra Leone, Liberia, Ivory Coast, Ghana, Togo, Benin, Nigeria, western Cameroon)

Etymology
The name honours Carl Plötz.

References

Spialia
Butterflies described in 1891
Butterflies of Africa